Hereford Cathedral School is an independent, co-educational boarding and day school for pupils of ages 3 to 18 years, from Nursery to Sixth Form. Its headmaster is a member of the Headmasters' and Headmistresses' Conference. The school's premises are next to Hereford Cathedral in Hereford.

History
There was probably a school associated with the Cathedral from the time of the foundation of the see in the late 7th century. Thus Hereford Cathedral School is likely to be among the oldest in England. The earliest documentary record of its existence dates from 1384 when Bishop John Gilbert appointed Richard de Cornwaille as school master and authorised him to rule over the school with birch and rod. The school's library is named after Bishop Gilbert and Cornwall house is named for Richard de Cornwaille.

During the following centuries the school attracted generous benefactors. It was rebuilt under the reign of King Edward VI, and it received considerable emoluments from Queen Elizabeth I in 1583. During the 17th century Dean Langford, Roger Philpotts, a former Mayor of Hereford, Sarah, dowager Duchess of Somerset (wife of John Seymour, 4th Duke of Somerset), and King Charles I all gave to the school for the foundation of scholarships and the purchase of buildings.

By 1762 the school building was once again rebuilt after it had fallen into disrepair and by the mid 19th century teaching was being carried out in the Headmaster's house. In 1875 new class rooms were built in School Yard.

The school remained relatively small in size until the inter-war period. It attained direct grant status in 1945 and by 1970 had expanded to 370 pupils, all of whom were boys and many of whom were boarders. In 1973, the school became co-educational. It was a direct grant school until 1975, and when this scheme was abolished, it chose to become independent. The school also participated in the Assisted Places Scheme from its introduction in 1980 until its abolition in 1997.

As of September 2022, the Headmaster of the school is Dr Michael Gray.

In 2019 Hereford Cathedral School reintroduced boarding for international students, opening a new boarding house in How Caple.

Curriculum
As well as core disciplines, other subjects taught in the school include Ancient History/Classical Civilisation, Art, Business Studies, Design and Technology, Drama, Economics, French, Japanese, Spanish, Greek, Latin, Further Mathematics, Psychology, Music and Textiles.

Sport
Among sports practised in the school are: Athletics, Badminton, Basketball, Canoeing, Cricket, Cross Country, Fencing, Fitness Training, Football, Hockey, Netball, Rounders, Rowing, Rugby, Swimming, Table Tennis, Tennis, Volleyball, and Ultimate Yo-Yo

Traditions
Every year pupils at the school run a cross-country race called the Hull Cup. The origins of this competition are said to be found with Hereford Cathedral organist Percy Hull who believed that the choristers at the time were in poor shape and so demanded that they take part in an annual run.

Although there is no official school song, the de facto school anthem is the hymn Jerusalem (English Hymnal 656A). It has become a school legend that the singing of this hymn during an assembly in the Cathedral on Friday, 27 May 1983 was heard outside Marks and Spencers in High Town. The hymn is a popular choice in weddings, memorial services and funerals of Old Herefordians.

House system
Upon entry into the school every pupil is assigned a house. The houses are as follows:

The four extant houses are: Langford (after Charles Langford, Dean of Hereford and benefactor 1607), Stuart (named after King Charles I, benefactor 1637), Somerset (named after Sarah Seymour, Duchess of Somerset, benefactor 1682) and Cornwall (named after Richard de Cornwaille, first known headmaster of Hereford Cathedral School, 1384).

Before the abolition of boarding at the school, there were also separately named houses for boarders, namely: School House, Number 1 (Castle Street) and Old Deanery. In those days, Cornwall, Langford, Somerset and Stuart consisted entirely of day pupils.

Uniform 
In the senior school (years 7–11) pupils are expected to wear a blazer with school crest, navy pinstripe trousers or skirt, plain white shirt, and an authorised school tie for boys. In the sixth form pupils are allowed to wear a grey, navy or black suit with authorised school tie. School ties include: house ties, sports colours, the Dean's Scholar tie, the sixth form tie, and various other ties awarded for specific contributions to the school.

Headmasters 
1385 Richardus de Cornwaille
1583 — May
1590 Thomas Cooxey
1595 — Povey
1637 Clement Barksdale
1669 Richard Gardiner, DD
1686 Robert Phillips
1687 Thomas Gwillim
1689 Richard Treherne
1711 John Rodd
1731 Thomas Willim
1748 John Stephens
1749 Richard Traherne
1762/3 Reverend Gibbons Bagnall/Thomas Horne
1778 Abraham Rudd
1784 Robert D. Squire, MA
1803 Reverend Samuel Picart, BD
1807 Charles Taylor, DD
1826 Charles Taylor, Junior, BD
1839 William Henry Ley, MA
1842 John Wooley, DD
1844 Thomas F. Layng, DD
1851 Reverend Thomas Barratt Power, MA
1857 John Woollam, MA
1869 Reverend Eric John Sutherland Rudd, MA
1875 Francis Hey Thatham, MA
1890 Thomas Thistle, MA
1898 Reverend Prebendary William Henry Murray Ragg, MA
1913 Reverend John Henson, MA
1920 Dr J. H. Crees
1940 C. Fairfax-Scott
1944 A. F. J. Hopewell
1956 W. J. R. Peebles
1967 David M. Richards
1975 Barry B. Sutton
1988 Canon Emeritus Dr Howard C. Tomlinson, BA, PhD, FRHistS
2006 Paul Smith, BSc
2021 Dr Michael Gray

Controversy
In December 2005 a former teacher was jailed for 27 months for setting up a secret camera in one of the school's changing rooms to film girl pupils undressing, and for downloading nearly 900 indecent images of children from the internet.

In November 2010, a former teacher, Neil Moore, was sentenced to 15 months for seducing a male pupil with alcohol at his home after messaging him on a dating website.

In February 2017, the school was sued by a former pupil who alleged that when he was transitioning from female to male, the school discriminated against him. In response, the school's governing body said that the pupil had been withdrawn before any decision on his support had been made.

In July 2020, a former teacher was convicted on several counts of having sexual activity with a student whilst in a position of trust. The acts occurred over a decade prior.

Extracurricular activities

Combined Cadet Force
The school operates a Combined Cadet Force composed of Royal Navy, Army and Royal Air Force sections. It is the second oldest school CCF in the country. Recently the organization has had notable success in the CCF (Army) March and Shoot. The unit is currently commanded by Sqn Ldr A D Howell.

The last Biennial Inspection was on 8 May 2014. The inspecting officer was Col Seal, who is the Deputy Commander of 143 Brigade.

Chamber Choir
The Hereford Cathedral School Chamber Choir tours internationally and has won a number of awards.

Old Herefordians

Upon leaving the school former pupils and staff are referred to as Old Herefordians (OH) and become members of the Old Herefordians Club. This entitles them to wear the colours of the Old Herefordians Club (navy blue, yellow and white).

Notable Old Herefordians include:

Denis ApIvor, (1916–2004) Composer
Wilfred Askwith, Bishop of Gloucester
Martin Baynton, writer and illustrator, creator of Jane and the Dragon books and TV series
Francis Berry, poet and university professor at Royal Holloway, University of London
James Bevan, rugby player and first Welsh international captain
Alan Bruce Blaxland, major-general
Kate Bliss, antiques expert
Arthur Boycott, scientist, particularly notable as in 2016 his granddaughter returned a book he borrowed sometime between 1886 and 1894
John Bradford (dissenting minister), dissenting minister
John Bull (composer), organist and composer
John Bury (theatre designer), theatre designer and Tony Award winner
Henry Bulmer, cider-maker
Fitzwilliam Coningsby, MP and Royalist leader
Sir John Cotterell, 1st Baronet, MP and landowner
David Cox Jr., painter
Sir Horace Cutler, Conservative politician and leader of the Greater London Council
David Darg, Oscar nominated film director
Andrew Davies, politician, formerly Minister for Enterprise, Innovation & Networks
John Davies of Hereford, writing master and Anglo-Welsh poet
Geoffrey Dhenin, physician and senior Royal Air Force officer
John Du Buisson, Dean of St Asaph
Pete Farndon, (1952–1983) Bass Guitarist of The Pretenders rock group
Edward Garbett, theologian
James Garbett, clergyman and Oxford professor of poetry
Richard Gardiner (English divine), theologian and benefactor
Peter George (author), author of Red Alert, the inspiration for Stanley Kubrick's Dr. Strangelove
Richard Gething, writing master
Michael Goaman, postage stamp designer
William Gregory, Speaker of the House of Commons
Silvanus Griffiths, Dean of Hereford Cathedral
John Guillim, herald
Matthew Hall, barrister, screenwriter and novelist
John Hardy (composer), composer
Robert Hollingworth, musician and choral director
Charles Hopton, Archdeacon of Birmingham
James Howell, historian, political writer, and first historiographer royal
Sir Hungerford Hoskyns, 4th Baronet, army officer and MP
Percy Hull, organist at Hereford Cathedral
David Keyte, former chairman of Hereford United F.C.
William Lambe, physician and pioneer of veganism
Edward William Lane, orientalist
Thomas Lewis (controversialist), High Church polemicist
Arthur Machen, supernatural and horror fiction author
Francis Mansell, Principal of Jesus College, Oxford
John Mayo (physician), physician
Richard Newman (priest), Archdeacon of Blackburn
Howard Nicholls, Welsh rugby player
Anthony Nuttall, literary critic and academic
Francis Oakeley, England rugby player
Sir Michael Parker (event organizer), military officer and organiser of large scale productions, such as the Royal Edinburgh Military Tattoo
Matthew Parry, Warwickshire and Ireland cricketer
Arthur Peppercorn, Chief Mechanical Engineer of the London North Eastern Railway
G. H. Pember, theologian
Jemima Phillips, former Royal Harpist
William Powell (English actor), 18th century actor
Harry Ragg, Bishop of Calgary
E. J. Rapson, numismatist and professor of Sanskrit (1906–36) at the University of Cambridge
Gordon Rawcliffe, engineering academic
Heaton Rhodes, New Zealand politician and lawyer
Owain Richards, entomologist and ecologist
Peter Richardson (cricketer), England cricketer
Dick Richardson (cricketer), England cricketer
David Roberts (diplomat), Ambassador to Syria, the United Arab Emirates, and Lebanon
John Ross (bishop of Exeter), Georgian Bishop of Exeter
Alick Rowe, writer
Daniel Rowland, Welsh Calvinistic Methodist preacher
Miles Smith, Bishop of Gloucester and translator of the King James Bible
Philip Wilson Steer OM, impressionist artist
Noel Symonds, rower
Richard Symonds-Tayler, admiral
Paul Thorburn, Welsh rugby international
Thomas Traherne (though nothing certain is known about his education before Oxford)
John Ware (cricketer), cricketer and priest
Ivor Watkins, Bishop of Guildford
Frederick Weatherly (1848–1929) Wrote over 3000 popular songs, including "Roses of Picardy", as well as the best-known set of words for "Danny Boy".
David Williams (crime writer), author
Arthur Winnington-Ingram (Archdeacon of Hereford), Archdeacon of Hereford
George Yeld, schoolmaster, explorer, and illustrator

References

Notes
School ISC Reference Number:	80122
School ISI Reference Number:	6533
School DfE Reference Number:	884/6004

External links

Hereford Cathedral Junior School
Old Herefordians' Club

7th-century establishments in England
Hereford
Choir schools in England
Church of England private schools in the Diocese of Hereford
Educational institutions established in the 7th century
Private schools in Herefordshire
Member schools of the Headmasters' and Headmistresses' Conference
People educated at Hereford Cathedral School
Schools in Hereford